Philip Nolan may refer to:

 Philip Nolan (Texas trader) (1771–1801), horse-trader and freebooter in 18th-century Texas
 Phillip Nolan (basketball) (born 1993), American college basketball player
 Philip Nolan (Neighbours), fictional character on the Australian soap opera Neighbours
 Philip Nolan, protagonist of "The Man Without a Country"
 Philip Nolan (professor), president of Maynooth University

See also
 John Philip Nolan (1838–1912), Irish nationalist and politician
 Philip Francis Nowlan (1888–1940), American science fiction author